Irwin Army Community Hospital is a US Army medical facility at Fort Riley, Kansas, named after Brigadier General Bernard John Dowling Irwin.

References

External links
 Irwin Army Community Hospital

Hospitals in Kansas